Applethorpe is a rural town and locality in the Southern Downs Region, Queensland, Australia.  It is on Queensland's border with New South Wales. It is well known for the production of apples. It often records the lowest temperatures in Queensland.

Geography 

The Southern railway line passes through the locality from north (The Summit & Glen Niven) to south (Stanthorpe). The town was served by the now-abandoned Applethorpe railway station.

History 
The area was originally called Roessler after an early German settler, but the name was changed to Applethorpe (reflecting the apple orchards in the district) in 1915, as part of the anti-German sentiment during World War I.

In 1910, the establishment of the Four Mile Stanthorpe School was given and the school was opened on 14 September 1911. However, from November 1911 to November 1916, it was called Roesseller State School. However, like the town itself, the school name was changed to Applethorpe State School due to the anti-German sentiment.

In December 1910 the Roessler railway station was established at the  point between Thulimbah and Stanthorpe. In September 1916 it was renamed Applethorpe railway station due to anti-German sentiment.

Four Mile State School opened on 14 September 1911. In November 1911 it was renamed Roesseller State School in Nov 1911 and in 1917 it was renamed Applethorpe State School.

Applethorpe Post Office opened around 1919 (a receiving office had been open since 1916) and closed in 1991.

In 2006, Applethorpe had a population of 748; of which, 20% worked in the farming or produce industries.

Climate

During a cold snap in 2007, the town recorded a minimum temperature of −7.7 °C. In July 2010, Applethorpe recorded a minimum of 13.6 °C which was the highest minimum on record ever for that month.

Transport
Applethorpe is accessible by the New England Highway  Crisps Coaches also runs regular services to Applethorpe from Brisbane, Toowoomba, and other cities in the area.

Despite the name, Stanthorpe Airport is on Aerodrome Road in the east of Applethorpe. It is a public airport operated by the Southern Downs Regional Council. There are no regular scheduled services to this airport.

Education 

Applethorpe State School is a government primary (Prep-6) school for boys and girls at 25576 New England Highway. In 2017, the school had an enrolment of 38 students with 4 teachers (3 full-time equivalent) and 5 non-teaching staff (3 full-time equivalent).

There are no secondary schools in Applethorpe. The nearest government secondary school is Stanthorpe State High School in neighbouring Stanthorpe to the south.

Attractions
The Applethorpe Memorial Park on Ann Street commemorates those who served in defence of Australia.

Granite Mountain Disc Golf course is also located in Applethorpe. It is a privately owned frisbee golf course, that hosted both the 2018 and 2019 Queensland state championships of the sport.

The "Summit Fruit Run" (Tourist Drive 3) is a  tourist drive from Applethorpe to Dalveen, passing through fruit-growing areas with opportunities to purchase fruit.

References

Further reading

External links

 University of Queensland: Queensland Places: Amiens, Thulimbah, Applethorpe District
 Town map, 1976

Towns in Queensland
Southern Downs Region
Localities in Queensland